Patrick Smith  is an Australian sports journalist and Walkley award recipient. He is noted for his pieces in The Australian newspapers' sports section.

Smith started his journalism career in 1972 with Melbourne's Sun as a copyboy, before moving to The Age in 1976. There he was promoted from sport sub to deputy sports editor, and then to sports editor which he remained for six years.

In 1993 he was a senior columnist for The Age, leaving for The Australian in 2000.

He also appears on Hungry for Sport with  Kevin Bartlett on SEN 1116.
Kevin Bartlett has not been on SEN for over a year and Smith no longer contributes to that station.
He writes pieces on political issues in sport, including the internal workings of Australian rules football, Cricket and Athletics Australia.

He won Walkley awards for his commentary and analysis of sport in 1997, 2002 and 2004

In 2017 Smith controversially wrote “Hird, sadly, drove himself to the intensive care unit, calling the directions all the way.” following James Hird's attempt to take his own life. 

In 2001 and 2002 Smith won "Most Outstanding Columnist" at the AFL Media Awards. In 2009 he was awarded a High Commendation in the competition for the Graham Perkin Australian Journalist of the Year Award.

Smith was awarded the Medal of the Order of Australia in the 2021 Queen's Birthday Honours for "service to the print media as a journalist".

Smith falsely accused Legendary commentator Bruce McAvaney of a poor call of the 10000m men’s race at the 2021 Japan Olympics, only to be criticised for publishing a poor form tweet and being unprofessional.

References

Australian sports journalists
Year of birth missing (living people)
Living people

Recipients of the Medal of the Order of Australia